Karaburun is a district and the center town of the same district of İzmir Province, Turkey.

Karaburun or Karaburnu (literally "black nose" or "black cape") is a Turkish place name. It may also refer to:

Karaburun Peninsula, Albania, a peninsula in Albania
Karaburun Peninsula, Turkey, a peninsula in Turkey
Karaburun, Arnavutköy, a seaside resort in Istanbul Province, Turkey
Karaburun, Gölbaşı, a village in the district of Gölbaşı, Adıyaman Province, Turkey
Karaburun, İskilip, a village in İskilip district of Çorum Province, Turkey
Karaburun (Bozburun), a cape in the peninsula of Bozburun, Turkey, delimiting the Aegean and the East Mediterranean sea 
(Great) Karaburnu, Halkidiki or Megalo Embolo, a cape near Thessaloniki, Greece
Mikro Karabournou 'Small Karaburnu', Karabournaki, or Mikro Embolo, a cape near Thessaloniki, Greece

See also
Karaburun Peninsula (disambiguation)
Karaburun tragedy